The 1925–26 Yorkshire Cup was the eighteenth competition in this series. This year again saw a new name added to the list of cup winners. This time it was Dewsbury winning the trophy by beating Huddersfield in the final 2–0. The match was played at Belle Vue, in the City of Wakefield, now in West Yorkshire. The attendance was 12,616 and receipts were £718. This was the last time for another fourteen years that a new name would be added.

Background 

The Rugby Football League's Yorkshire Cup competition was a knock-out competition between (mainly professional) rugby league clubs from the county of Yorkshire. The actual area was at times increased to encompass other teams from  outside the  county such as Newcastle, Mansfield, Coventry, and even London (in the form of Acton & Willesden.

The Rugby League season always (until the onset of "Summer Rugby" in 1996) ran from around August-time through to around May-time and this competition always took place early in the season, in the Autumn, with the final taking place in (or just before) December. The only exception to this was when disruption of the fixture list was caused during, and immediately after, the two World Wars.

Competition and results  
This season there was only one junior/amateur club taking part, Castleford, at the time still a junior club, but which would be joining the league in the next closed season. This resulted in a reduction in entrants of just one, giving a total of fifteen entrants. This in turn resulted in one bye in the first round.

Round 1 
Involved  7 matches (with one bye) and 15 clubs

Round 1 - replays  
Involved  1 match and 2 clubs

Round 2 – quarterfinals 
Involved 4 matches and 8 clubs

Round 3 – semifinals  
Involved 2 matches and 4 clubs

Final

Teams and scorers 

Scoring - Try = three (3) points - Goal = two (2) points - Drop goal = two (2) points

The road to success

Notes
1 * Castleford were at that time a junior club. They joined the league for season 1926–27

2 * Belle Vue is the home ground of Wakefield Trinity with a capacity of approximately 12,500. The record attendance was 37,906 on the 21 March 1936 in the Challenge Cup semi-final between Leeds and Huddersfield

See also 
1925–26 Northern Rugby Football League season
Rugby league county cups

References

External links
Saints Heritage Society
1896–97 Northern Rugby Football Union season at wigan.rlfans.com
Hull&Proud Fixtures & Results 1896/1897
Widnes Vikings - One team, one passion Season In Review - 1896-97
The Northern Union at warringtonwolves.org

RFL Yorkshire Cup
Yorkshire Cup